The Keighley Cougars are a professional rugby league club from Keighley in West Yorkshire, England who compete in the Championship, the second tier of English rugby league.  Keighley's home ground, Cougar Park has a capacity of 7,800.

History

Early years

The club was formed at a meeting held on 17 October 1876 under the presidency of the Reverend Marriner. A committee was elected and the club was allowed the use of Holmes' field in Lawkholme Lane.

The first kick-off took place on Saturday afternoon, 21 October and the committee met again on 24 October and decided to adopt Association and Rugby football laws. On 18 November 1876, the first game took place at Lawkholme Lane. The visitors were Crosshills and although the game ended in a draw, there are records, which say, "the draw was in the visitors' favour".

The first important match appears to have been played on 13 January 1877 against Bingley. Under the scoring system of the day, the visitors won by two tries and two touchdowns to two touchdowns. Keighley also lost a further two games against Bingley.

One of the earliest games of the following season was a fixture with Kildwick on 13 October 1877 when Keighley won by one goal to five touchdowns. Other teams met during that second season were Bradford Zingari, Manningham, Cleckheaton, Leeds Athletic, Skipton and Bradford Juniors. Up to April 1878, Keighley and Bingley had met seven times with Keighley losing every match.

At the annual meeting of the club in 1878, shortly after the headquarters had been moved to Dalton Lane, a second XV was formed. Keighley Athletic were formed on 27 October 1879. There was some rivalry with those who had set up the new club, but a couple of years later these differences had been settled, and on 24 March 1881 a merger was agreed between the two clubs.

Keighley officially joined the Rugby Football Union on Tuesday, 8 April 1879, and the following year, in a match at Bingley, there was a peculiar incident. A report of the game states that Bradbury attempted a drop goal, but the ball passed under the crossbar, and Bairstow, following up, touched down. Bingley would not concede the try, alleging that the player who obtained it was offside, and due to their refusal to allow the ball to be brought out, the home players left the field and the game was unfinished.

By the end of season 1880–81, the membership of the club was 80; ten honorary members and 70 playing members. In 1882–83 "the team had a most successful experience". Gate receipts reached £58 and expenditure was £32.

In March 1882, the team figured in the Yorkshire Cup for the first time. They met Wakefield Trinity, who were one of the top sides. During that year, a match with Hunslet F.C. was played under Association rules which ended in a draw. It was probably the only Association game ever played by the town's club.

In April 1885, the club merged with Keighley Cricket and Football Club, and from that time the club played on the Lawkholme Lane ground. Soon membership had risen to 300 and dressing rooms and headquarters were established at the Black Horse Hotel. The first game at Lawkholme took place on 10 October 1885, against Liversedge. The club's fixture list was improved and in 1886–87 played clubs such as Hipperholme and Lightcliffe, Bramley, Otley, York, Shipley, Ossett, Bingley, Pudsey, Halifax Free Wanderers, Morley, Skipton and Hunslet.

The club reached one of its best seasons in 1892–93 when the team figured in several rounds of the cup and won no less than 22 matches during the season. Leagues were being formed about this time and in 1893–94 Keighley had a try at the Intermediate Competition and finished sixth with a record of eleven wins and eleven defeats.

The following season the club did badly and finished tenth, but in 1895–96, the side came into its own again and finished fourth.

The sweet taste of success came Keighley's way in 1896–97 when they won the Second Competition championship. The final match of the competition took place at Mytholmroyd on 3 April 1897, and despite a bitterly cold day there was a gate of 2,000 of which over half had travelled from Keighley. Keighley won 6–3. This heralded a run of success which saw them win the First Competition championship in 1899–1900 after having been runners-up the two preceding years.

Northern Union

On 12 April 1900, Keighley Rugby Union Club decided to apply for membership of the Northern Union. Keighley were elected into the Yorkshire Second Competition on 14 July 1900.

Two days after deciding to change to rugby league, Keighley played Manningham, in the first ever rugby league match at Lawkholme Lane; Manningham won 5–2. They finished in second place and the following season they were "promoted" to the Yorkshire Senior Competition as fourteen of the leading clubs broke away from the two County Leagues, to form a new Northern Rugby League.

In March 1901, Keighley entered the Northern Union Cup (now known as the Challenge Cup) for the first time. They beat Kinsley before meeting York. Keighley refused £120 to transfer the tie, and despite a sending-off, earned a 5–5 draw in front of a crowd of 5,293. In the replay York had a player sent off but won 12–0.

In 1902–03, the Lancashire and Yorkshire leagues were combined to form a second division. Keighley was one of the new clubs to join the second division, which they topped with 27 wins out of 34 games and were duly promoted.

Keighley had their greatest cup season up to that time. They reached the semi-final of the Challenge Cup for the first time by beating Castleford, Egremont, Hull F.C. and Featherstone Rovers before falling to Salford in the semi-final at Warrington. An old newspaper clipping says that "dissatisfaction among the players with regard to terms of payment was the reason for this defeat, and but for this very discreditable piece of business Keighley would have opposed Bradford in the final".

On 19 December 1906, tragedy overtook the club when Harry Myers died as a result of an accident on the field of play. About that time Keighley were one of the leading teams in the Challenge Cup and again in 1907–08 they advanced to the third round by virtue of wins over Brookland Rovers and Whitehaven.

During the years of the First World War the club arranged no fixtures and did not take part in the 1918–19 season. When the game returned to normal there was a hectic period of team rebuilding, and following a really bad season in 1921, six new players were signed from the Furness district.

The 1925–26 season was memorable for a first round Challenge Cup tie with Bradford Northern which had to be replayed twice. The aggregate attendance for those three games was nearly 47,000 and the total gate receipts of £3,043 constituted a record for a first round tie.

The club became a limited company in 1929, but failed to make any immediate improvement. During the 1930s, Keighley began to make progress. Major Norman Harrison, the club secretary/manager, was responsible for signing a side that was to reach great heights.

1930s and 1940s
The big coup in 1932, when Ted Spillane, the New Zealand halfback signed for the side. That season saw hundreds of lost supporters return and gates reached unprecedented heights. The result was that the directors launched a big scheme of ground improvements. The new stand and improvements were opened on 9 September 1933 when Leeds were the visitors to Lawkholme, and though that particular match was lost the season was to be a notable one.

With such fine forwards as Harold "Hal" Jones and George Dixon from Wigan, and Jimmy Gill from Leeds, already having joined Keighley during their period of revival, there came more important signings in the latter part of the 1930s.

Keighley played in their first and so far only Challenge Cup final in 1937. Having beaten Hunslet, Broughton Rangers, Liverpool Stanley in earlier rounds they played Wakefield Trinity in the semi-final. The first semi-final, held in Leeds on the third of April, was a scoreless draw, but four days later at Huddersfield, Keighley beat Wakefield Trinity 5–3. However, Widnes won the final 18–5.

After their Wembley appearance, Keighley again suffered a decline. In November 1938, they were at the top of the Rugby League table, for the first time ever, for a spell of three weeks, but this form was not maintained and they finished 16th with 17 wins, 17 defeats and two draws.

The main reason for the club's decline was that veterans were not replaced quickly enough, and the one promising young player, Reggie Lloyd, was transferred to Castleford in 1938. In the season after Wembley, Keighley were 13th in the league table. This was to be the last season of competitive peacetime rugby before the Second World War.

During the war years many young players were naturally called into the armed forces. The Rugby League decided to form the Lancashire and Yorkshire Emergency Leagues at the beginning of the 1939–40 season. A system of "guest" players was introduced the following season, some players who guested for Keighley include Jim Sullivan, Les "Cowboy" Jones, and Melville De Lloyd. Keighley and Bradford Northern became regular cup-tie opponents during the war years.

In season 1941–42 Keighley lost both legs in the first round of the Challenge Cup, but got their revenge a year later when they triumphed home and away in the second round of the same competition.

On 13 November 1943, Keighley won the first leg of the Yorkshire Cup semi-final at Lawkholme Lane against Huddersfield 21–0. Although Keighley lost the second leg at Fartown 13–4 and they qualified for the final on aggregate. Keighley played Bradford Northern in the final. This as well, was a two-legged affair with Northern just coming out the better overall. They achieved a slender 5–2 advantage in the first leg at Odsal Stadium, and held Keighley to a 5–5 draw in the return encounter at Lawkholme Lane a week later. That second leg attracted Keighley's biggest wartime 'gate' of 9,487 (£694).

Keighley again met Northern in the second round of the Challenge Cup later the same season. They lost both home and away. And in the 1944–45 season the sides met in the third round of the Challenge Cup when Northern comfortably won on aggregate (35–8) after Keighley had established a 5–0 advantage in the first leg at Lawkholme Lane.

Post war
Guest players who had played for Keighley during the war years returned to their own clubs when regular competition was resumed in 1945. There were also a number of local players who had joined the club during the war years who blossomed into notable members of the senior side.
Keighley finished sixth from the bottom of the league table.

On 14 February 1948, Keighley were the victims of one of the biggest Challenge Cup upsets when they were defeated 2–10 by Cumbrian junior club, Risehow and Gillhead. Fortunately for Keighley they had established an 11–0 lead in the first leg of first round at Lawkholme Lane, though they only scraped home on aggregate by a matter of three points.

Keighley's highest attendance was set at 14,500 for the Challenge Cup clash against Halifax on 3 March 1951. For the second time in their history, Keighley reached the final of the Yorkshire Cup  in 1951. On their way to the final held at Fartown, they defeated Castleford, Halifax and Hunslet. Until half-time Keighley were well placed against their opponents – Wakefield Trinity. But in the second period Trinity played some fine rugby and went on to win 17–3. The Yorkshire Cup defeat seemed to have an adverse effect on Keighley who won only one of their 20 remaining games up to the end of the 1951–52 season and they finished third from the bottom of the league.

The 1952–53 season opened on 6 September. The eighth Australian touring side opened their campaign with a game at Lawkholme Lane – for the first time in front of the television cameras. Keighley were on the wrong end of a thrashing as the Aussies scored a half-century and beat the previous best score for a touring side in an opening match.

Probably the most important changes on the administrative side came in December 1953, when an entirely new board of directors took over. On Wednesday, 9 December, following a major financial crisis, the existing members of the board resigned and were replaced by an entirely new board. Share capital was increased from £3,000 to £10,000 through the issuing of an additional 7,000 £1 shares. The traditional playing colours of blue and white were discarded in favour of the present colours of red, white and green.

In 1957 the board bought the Lawkholme Lane rugby ground, cricket ground, bowling green and cottages for £10,000.

Rugby league as a whole went through a two-decade slump that started in the 1960s, attendances dropped and so did Keighley's performances.

9 November 1975 saw them play the New Zealand touring side including names such as Kurt Sorenson, Ken Stirling

The 1980s
The 1980–81 season started badly but 11 wins and one draw from the last 17 games brought some respectability. Albert Fearnley resigned as coach due to poor health and was replaced by Bak Diabira. His first match was a home game against Doncaster on 15 March 1981; Keighley winning 6–5, and completed the last seven games. The team finished the season in 7th position, winning 14 and drawing one from 28 games.

Keighley continued the 1981–82 season where they had left off the previous season by winning 10 of their first 14 league games. Terrible winter weather with weeks of snow and frost hit and no matches were played between 6 December and 3 January. This break upset Keighley's form and they won only 8 out of the remaining 18 games. Keighley finished in 7th position once again.

Despite reaching the Yorkshire Cup semi–final which they lost 3–23 to Hull, the 1982–83 league campaign started badly. Keighley lost their opening three games and Bak Diabira quit as coach. Lee Greenwood, the A-team coach, took over and this immediately led to an eight-game unbeaten streak. However this could not be kept up and a spate of injuries helped to create inconsistency, especially away from home. Keighley finished the season in ninth place in the league, winning 15, drawing 5 and losing 12.

The 1983–84 season saw the worst results, since World War Two. Lee Greenwood was released after a 30–0 defeat by bottom club, Doncaster on 24 August 1983. His replacement, Geoff Peggs, was forced to rely on trialists; a total of 54 players were used including 31 debutantes during this campaign. Without this step, there would have been a danger of being unable to fulfil the fixture list. Keighley finished second from bottom of the second division with only seven wins and three draws from 34 games. The club announced massive debts and planned to sell part of the ground.

53 players were used in the 1984–85 season, which again included 31 debutantes. Despite this, Keighley's results improved and they finished 15th in the league, winning 11 games.

100 years of rugby at Lawkholme Lane was celebrated during the 1985–86 season. With mounting debts and a ground in need of investment in light of the Taylor Report. In October 1985 Keighley were served a winding-up order by Inland Revenue, which was avoided only by selling the cricket field for a reported £30,000 and the training pitch for £65,000. Keighley for the second time in three years finished the season in the second from bottom position of the second division and had taken some heavy defeats along their way. These included the worst ever defeat 2–92 away to Leigh. These poor results affected attendances and Keighley's record for the lowest gate was broken twice. First against Workington Town on 23 April when the crowd was just 386 and again on 7 May against Whitehaven when only 355 turned up to witness the 0–16 defeat. Peter Roe took over as coach mid-way through the season following the sudden death of Geoff Peggs and the results improved temporarily. Roe left the following year.

Lawkholme Lane was sold in the late 1980s to the Co-op for approximately £10,000 and leased back to the club.

The 1987–88 season saw a recovery on the field, attributed to the signing of experienced players Trevor Skerrett, Gary Moorby and Brenden White. Attendances increased, averaging 951 in the league and a 2–16 defeat to Widnes in the second round of the Challenge Cup drew a crowd of 4,358 watched Keighley lose 2–16. Keighley finished in eighth position, winning 15 from 28 games and eventually lost to league leaders Oldham, 24–34 in the end of season play-offs.

The 1988–89 season was another year of consolidation. Keighley again completed the season in eighth position, winning 16 from 28 games. The average attendance again increased by 135 to 1,193, the best since the 1981–82 season.

For the 1989–90 season Colin Dixon moved up onto the board of directors and Les Coulter took over as head coach. The season featured a run of eleven matches with only two victories. Keighley finished the season 19th out of 21 clubs and winning only 6 games out of 28.

1990–1995: Cougarmania
By the early 1990s things had become almost critical for Keighley, the ground was decrepit and the team was losing to the likes of the now defunct Nottingham City.

In 1991 Mick O'Neil, Mike Smith and Neil Spencer joined the board and embarked on re-branding; the first being to rebrand the club Keighley Cougars and to rename the ground, Lawkholme Lane, as Cougar Park.

Peter Roe returned to the club as head coach in September 1991 and stayed until 1994.

In 1993, the Cougars won the third division only to be denied promotion due to the Rugby Football League merging the second and third divisions.

Investment in good players, and an expansive style helped crowds increase from 350 in 1989 to an average of over 4,000 in 1995, and on-field success followed. The club invested heavily: in new terracing; a new club-house; the Great Britain coach Phil Larder; and a full-time team.

1996–2000: Summer era
The club succeeded in winning the Second Division Championship in the 1994–95 season. However, when the Super League was created for the following year, Keighley were excluded, and the edifice collapsed as the disappointment of being denied promotion for a second time due to marketing decisions, cost them fans and sponsors.

Keighley took out an injunction to try to stop the new competition kicking off and only withdrew their legal threat with the offer of more money for lower division clubs and the prospect of promotion and relegation.

The following year, there was only one promotion place into Super League and competing against some of the larger relegated teams the Cougars could only manage second place to Salford. The club was taken over in a coup by Carl Metcalfe who promised to invest £3 million into the team and the ground. O'Neil, and directors Neil Spencer and Maurice Barker left to make way for the new regime. Phil Larder resigned after not being paid and was replaced by player coach Daryl Powell in April 1995.

The club offered to change their name to Pennine Cougars and ground-share with Burnley F.C. at Turf Moor in an attempt to be fast-tracked into Super League.

The promised millions did not materialise, and only months later, Metcalfe sold the senior squad, including Powell, to Leeds for about £10,000 and put the club into administration. He was later arrested and convicted of supplying fake illegal drugs.

Lee Crooks was coach between 1998 and 1999. Karl Harrison was appointed head coach in 2000 and guided Keighley to a second-place finish in the Northern Ford Premiership. Assistant coach, Steve Deakin, joined Rochdale Hornets as head coach in August before rejoining Keighley as head coach in September 2000 when Harrison left to become assistant coach at Bradford.

2001–2017: Lower leagues and administrations
After dissolving in liquidation, the club was reformed as Keighley Cougars 2001 by former directors Neil Spencer and Colin Farrer.

In January 2002, Keighley appointed Gary Moorby as their coach in succession to Steve Deakin who left to join London Broncos as their assistant coach.

Keighley won promotion from National League Two in 2003 by winning the divisional final after only finishing third in the League and were promoted to National League One, having defeated Sheffield Eagles in the final. However the following season they were immediately relegated back to National League Two after a dismal season in which they only won one league game and were eliminated from the Challenge Cup by amateur side, Dudley Hill.

Peter Roe returned for his third spell in charge at Lawkholme Lane at the end of 2005, succeeding Gary Moorby. but left in 2007 after admitting he had become bored with the role and player-coach Barry Eaton took over control.

Since relegation in 2004 the club had remained in League 1 until 2009 when after beating York in the playoffs, they beat Oldham in the League 1 Grand Final on 4 October 2009, winning 28–26 to gain promotion to the Championship for 2010 in a game staged at the Halliwell Jones Stadium, Warrington.

In November 2009 a winding up petition against the owners of the club was issued by HM Revenue and Customs (HMRC) for unpaid taxes. The petition hearing was adjourned until January 2010 but in the interim Keighley Cougars (2001) Ltd went into administration on 18 December 2009 following a hearing at the High Court in Leeds. Administrators were appointed and the assets of Keighley Cougars (2001) Ltd i.e. the club, were immediately sold to a new company Keighley Cougars (2010) Ltd.

In line with RFL rules the club had a 9-point deduction applied to the following season and once again having gained promotion to the League's second tier, Keighley were immediately relegated.

Between the 2010 and 2011 season player coach Barry Eaton left to be replaced by former Super League star Jason Demetriou as player coach.

2011 was Demetriou's first season as a coach and the Cougars, having finished second in the league, won promotion to the Championship beating Workington Town 32–12 in the playoff final.

Demetriou left at the end of the 2012 season with his side comfortably ensconced in the Championship and was succeeded by Paul March.  Under March the Cougars played in the Championship until 2014 when they were relegated in controversial circumstances that led the club to consider taking legal action against the RFL.  Keighley finished 10th in the league on 44 points. Batley Bulldogs finished with 42 points after being penalised three points for fielding an ineligible player in an earlier game. The deduction was appealed successfully by Batley leaving them on 45 points, one ahead of Keighley.

No legal action was taken after the RFL agreed to review the disciplinary system.

The 2015 season, during which Danny Jones died whilst playing for the club, and 2016 season were played in Championship 1 with Paul March in charge.  March led the club to victory in the 2016 iPro Sport Cup with a 22–18 win over York City Knights at Blackpool, however the failure to gain promotion cost March his job and he was replaced by Craig Lingard at the end of the 2016 season.

2018–present: Takeovers
In July 2018 chairman Gary Fawcett stood down and the club was acquired by Austria Holdings. The next day Steve Gill, former chief executive of Castleford Tigers, was appointed as general manager of the club. In November 2018 the players were in dispute with the owners regarding unpaid wages.  Austria Holdings ceded control of the club in December 2018 and Steve Gill left the club.

In January 2019 the club was purchased a consortium led by former owner Mick O'Neill.  The purchase by O'Neill, Cougarmania partner Mike Smith, O'Neill's son Ryan and his husband Kaue Garcia enabled the club to be taken out of special measures and to compete in the 2019 League 1 season but with a 12 point penalty deduction.

The Cougars decided to part company with head coach Craig Lingard midway through the 2019 season, replacing Craig shortly after with Rhys Lovegrove supported by returning ex-head coach Phil Larder. Larder's return was short lived as he left the club within a few weeks of his return for 'personal reasons'.

During the season the Cougars hosted what is believed to be the first Gay Pride event in rugby league.  David Connor, the RFL lead for diversity and equality, praised the club stating: "Rugby League has been breaking down social barriers for more than a hundred years and this is another important milestone. We pride ourselves on genuinely being a sport for all and Keighley are to be congratulated for actively demonstrating the inclusivity of our game".

The Cougars finished the 2019 season in 10th place with five points; despite this lowly finish the club was named RFL League 1 club of the year at the RFL annual awards ceremony in September 2019.

Club chairman, Mick O'Neill, was awarded the MBE for 'services to Rugby League Football, the community in Keighley, West Yorkshire and to Charity during the Covid-19 Pandemic' in the 2021 New Year Honours.

The 2021 season saw an improvement with the team reaching the play-offs, losing in the preliminary final to Doncaster.

2022 saw the Cougars win League One going undefeated in the league season to clinch the title with two game left.

Rivalry

Keighley's main rivals are nearby Bradford Bulls.  The clubs play a friendly in pre-season for the Joe Phillips Memorial Trophy, named after a former player at both clubs.
During the 'Cougarmania' days, the club enjoyed a rivalry with Huddersfield which saw huge crowds including travelling support attend the games, the rivalry ended when the Giants were admitted to Super league.

Kit sponsors and manufacturers

2023 squad

2023 transfers

Gains
 

Departures

Players

Players earning international caps while at Keighley
A number of players have been capped for their countries while playing for Keighley.

 C. Burton (England)
 Jason Critchley (Wales)
 Colin Evans (Wales)
 Norman Foster (England)
 Stuart Gallacher (Wales)
 Terry Hollindrake (Great Britain)
 Brian Jefferson (England)
 Danny Jones (Wales)
 W. Jones (Wales)
 Harold "Hal" Jones (Wales)
 Jason Lee (Wales)
 Neil Lowe (Scotland)
 Harry Myers (England) 
 L. Orchard (Wales)
 Nick Pinkney (England)
 Daryl Powell (Great Britain)
 William "Billy" Watson (Wales)
 Oliver Wilkes (Scotland)

Other notable players

These players have either; received a testimonial match, or were international representatives before, or after, their time at Keighley.

 Bill Aspinall (Testimonial match 1972)
 Llew Bevan (circa-1940s/50s
 Charlie Birdsall circa-1974
 Neville Black circa-1953  (ex-Wigan)
 Gordon Brown
 John Burke  circa-1974
 Geoff Butterfield (Testimonial match 1995)
 Phil Cantillon
 Des Clarkson 
 Thomas Cockcroft  1938 & 1944
 William Cockcroft  1967 & 1974
 Isaac Cole
 Bert Cook
 David Creasser
 Geoff Crewdson (Testimonial match 1966)
 Sam Crowther 2009–10
 Dai Davies 
 Kenneth Davies  (Testimonial match 1950)
 Mel De Lloyd
 Alan Dickinson 
 Keith Dixon (Testimonial match 1995)
 Grant Doorey
 Jason Donnelly
 Geoff Dudley circa-1962
 Barry Eaton
 Kevin Ellis
 St. John Ellis
 Joe Flanagan circa-1962
 Darren Fleary
 Brian Gaines circa-1965
 Dave Garbett circa-1974
 Tony Garforth  circa-1976
 Ian Gately  circa-1995
 Joey Grima
 Frank Haigh circa-1962
 Derek Hallas 12/1953…01/1959, and 10/1962…04/1963 Great Britain, Yorkshire (RU)/(RL), Roundhay (RU), Leeds, and Parramatta player
 Sid Hebden circa-1962
 Iorwerth Herbert circa-1940s/1950s
 Fred Higginbotham ( from Warrington) circa-1940s/1950s
 Brendan Hill  circa-1990s
 Ian Hughes
 Dave Jickells,  
 Eric Johnson circa-1953  (ex-Wigan)
 Alan Kellett  player-coach from February 1968, Captain
 Dick Kendall 1921/22-1932/33
 Bob Kelly
 Brian Larkin 
 Reg Lloyd (Resolven) circa-1940s/1950s
 John Mantle
 John A Martin
 Frank Mortimer
 Dick Moulding 
 Paul Moses (Testimonial match 1995)
 Harry Murphy, for England while at Wakefield Trinity 1946 France, Wales, for Great Britain while at Wakefield Trinity 1950 Australia (Later joined Keighley)
 Kevan Narey 1950s/60s
 Terry O'Brien  (Testimonial match 1973)
 Garfield Owen
 Harold Palin
 Eric Palmer 
 Lee Paterson
 Tony Pell 
 E. Perkins 1921/22-1932/33
 Syd Phillips circa-1962
 Harry Plunkett
 Keith Pollard  circa-1967
 Barry Potter 
 Rod Raines circa-1953  (ex-Wigan)
 Dean Raistrick  circa-1974
 Jason Ramshaw (Testimonial match 2002)
 Eric Redman circa-1962
 Kenny Roberts 
 Peter Roe
 Jack Rogers 
 Jordan Ross
 Albert Rowlands circa-1953  (ex-Wigan)
 Roy Sabine
 Bill Sharpe circa-1962
 Joseph Sherburn circa-1922
 Trevor Skerrett
 M. Slater circa-1922
 Mel Smith circa-1962
 Richard Smith
 Phil Stephenson (Testimonial match 2005)
 Andre Stoop
 Jim Sullivan
 Latham Tawhai
 Lewis Taylor
 Bryan Todd
 Jim Traill 
 Rob Valentine
 J. Waite circa-1922
 Len Ward circa-1962
 Sonny Whakarau
 Philip Whiteside 
 Gary Widdop 
 Calvin Wilkes
 Daley Williams
 Ricky Winterbottom (Testimonial match 1995)
 Martin Wood
 George Woosey circa-1953  
 Dave Worthy
 Jamaine Wray
 Brian Wright circa-1962
 William Yiend

Past coaches
Also see :Category:Keighley Cougars coaches

 Jim Davies 1920
 Bert Cook 1953-195?
 Fred Barrett 195?-195?
 Russell Pepperell 196?-1964
 Gordon Brown 196?-196?
 Harry Street 1965-1967
 Donald Metcalfe 1967
 Alan Kellett 1968
 Mick Clark 1969-1969
 Roy Sabine 1976
 Bakary Diabira 1981–1982
 Lee Greenwood 1982–1983
 Geoff Peggs 1983–1985
 Peter Roe 1985–1986
 Colin Dixon 1986–89
 Les Coulter 1989–1990
 Tony Fisher 1990–1991
 Peter Roe 1991–1994
 Phil Larder 1994–1996
 Daryl Powell 1996–1997
 John Kain 1997–1998
 Lee Crooks 1998–1999
 Frank Punchard 1999
 Karl Harrison 2000
 Steve Deakin 2000-2001
 Gary Moorby 2002–2005
 Peter Roe 2006
 Barry Eaton 2007–2010
 Jason Demetriou 2011–2012
 Paul March 2013–2016
 Craig Lingard 2017–2019
 Rhys Lovegrove 2019–present

Seasons

Summer era

Honours
Leagues
Second Division / Championship:
Winners (2): 1902-03, 1994-95
Runners up (1): 1962-63
Third Division / League 1: 
Winners (3): 1992-93, 2003, 2022
Runners up (2): 2009, 2011

Cups
Challenge Cup: 
Runners up (1): 1937

League 1 Cup: 
Winners (1): 2016

Records
 Biggest home victory: 96–0 vs London Skolars 1 May 2022
 Biggest home winning margin: 96–0 vs London Skolars 1 May 2022
 Biggest away victory: 112–6 vs West Wales Raiders 15 September 2018
 Biggest home defeat: 0–78 vs Wigan 15 February 1998
 Biggest away defeat: 2–92 vs Leigh, 30 April 1996
 Highest home attendance: 14,500 vs Halifax, 3 March 1953
 Lowest home attendance: 216 vs Fulham, 4 April 1987

Notes

References

External links
 

 
Sport in the City of Bradford
1876 establishments in England
Rugby clubs established in 1876
English rugby league teams